Pembarthi Metal Craft is a metal handicraft made in  Pembarthi, Jangaon district, Telangana State, India. They are popular for their exquisite sheet metal art works. A few decades back there were about 150 families depend on the profession, right now the artisans decreased to about 20 to 30 due to lack of marketing avenues.  Presently the work again accelerating through online e commerce portal metalartisan.in

References

Indian metalwork
Hanamkonda district
Culture of Telangana
Geographical indications in Telangana